"From the Word Go" is a song written by Michael Garvin and Chris Waters, and recorded by American country music artist Michael Martin Murphey.  It was released in December 1988 as the fourth and final single from the album River of Time.  The song peaked at number 3 on the U.S. Billboard Hot Country Singles chart.

Chart performance

Year-end charts

References

1988 singles
Michael Martin Murphey songs
Songs written by Chris Waters
Warner Records singles
Songs written by Michael Garvin
1988 songs